Phaenobezzia is a genus of biting midges in the family Ceratopogonidae. There are more than 20 described species in Phaenobezzia.

Species
These 23 species belong to the genus Phaenobezzia:

 Phaenobezzia astyla Spinelli & Wirth, 1986
 Phaenobezzia beni Meillon & Wirth, 1983
 Phaenobezzia chonganensis Yu & Shen, 1998
 Phaenobezzia cinnae (Meillon, 1936)
 Phaenobezzia griseipennis (Clastrier, 1958)
 Phaenobezzia mashonensis (Ingram & Macfie, 1923)
 Phaenobezzia maya Spinelli & Wirth, 1986
 Phaenobezzia mellipes Wirth & Ratanaworabhan, 1981
 Phaenobezzia nitens Liu, Ge & Liu, 1996
 Phaenobezzia nzuari (Vattier & Adam, 1966)
 Phaenobezzia opaca (Loew, 1861)
 Phaenobezzia pajoti (Vattier & Adam, 1966)
 Phaenobezzia pistiae (Ingram & Macfie, 1921)
 Phaenobezzia probata (Meillon, 1937)
 Phaenobezzia rara Saha & Gupta, 2001
 Phaenobezzia sabroskyi Wirth & Grogan, 1982
 Phaenobezzia spekei (Macfie, 1939)
 Phaenobezzia stuckenbergi (Haeselbarth, 1965)
 Phaenobezzia suavis Saha & Gupta, 2001
 Phaenobezzia tropica (Clastrier & Wirth, 1961)
 Phaenobezzia vacunae (Meillon, 1936)
 Phaenobezzia vulgaris Saha & Gupta, 2001
 † Phaenobezzia wirthi Szadziewski & Grogan, 1997

References

Further reading

 
 
 

Ceratopogonidae
Articles created by Qbugbot
Chironomoidea genera